Gurbishte is a mountain village in Ardino Municipality, Kardzhali Province, southern-central Bulgaria. It lies to the southwest of Sinchets, and northeast of Padina. It covers an area of 14.494 square kilometres and as of 2007 had a population of 183 people. The village contains a village hall.

References

Villages in Kardzhali Province